"Boyfriend/Girlfriend" is the second single by hip-hop group C-Side from their EP Class in Session. The original version features Flaire Jonez while the remix features Keyshia Cole. It was released to radio and charted.

Charts

Remix 

Cole's verses in the remix interpolate Usher's 2004 single "Burn". The music video for the song was directed by Benny Boom.

Music video 
The music video was directed by Benny Boom.

Charts

References

External links 
 

2008 singles
Keyshia Cole songs
Music videos directed by Benny Boom
Song recordings produced by Danja (record producer)
2008 songs
Universal Republic Records singles
Song articles with missing songwriters